Melaka Butterfly and Reptile Sanctuary is a butterfly house in Ayer Keroh, Malacca, Malaysia, which was opened in 1991 and built over a 11-hectare of jungle area. It is divided into five sections, which are Koi River Valley, Butterfly Garden, Reptile Aviary, Wild Photo Lane and Nature's Art Centre.

See also
 List of tourist attractions in Malacca
 List of butterfly houses

References

External links
 

1991 establishments in Malaysia
Ayer Keroh
Buildings and structures in Malacca
Tourist attractions in Malacca
Zoos established in 1991
Zoos in Malaysia